Janjevci or Kosovo Croats are the Croat community in Kosovo, inhabiting the town of Janjevo and surrounding villages near Pristina, as well as villages centered on Letnica near Vitina (Šašare, Vrnez, and Vrnavokolo), who are also known as Letničani.

Identity and culture
The Janjevci declare as ethnic Croats, and derive their ethnonym (Janjevci) from their traditional community centre, in Janjevo. It is believed that the community descends from migrating merchants from the Republic of Ragusa (Dubrovnik and its hinterland) who settled the area in the 14th century medieval Serbia. The first written mention of Catholics in Janjevo is a letter written by Pope Benedict XI in 1303, mentioning Janjevo as the center of the Catholic parish of St. Nicholas. Together with the Saxons from Saxony, they worked the Serbian mines. The Croatian population of Shasharë is believed to be of partial Saxon origin.

They have maintained their Catholic faith until today. The community speaks the Prizren-South Morava dialect.

Janjevci have adopted the tradition of celebrating "Slava" - patron saint of the family. Most of the families together celebrate Saint Nicholas (December 6th and May 9th) along with Saint Sebastian, Saint Anne and Anthony of Padua. Traditional "Pogača" and a candle are blessed by a priest and used at the family gathering at the evening before the main feast.

The parish church celebrates it's feast day on the day of Translation of the Relics of Saint Nicholas from Myra to Bari (May 9th in byzantine calendar) which is known among Janjevci as "sveti Nikola ljetni" (also "župna slava" or "dan župe").

Community also celebrated Saint George's Day (known among Janjevci as "Đurđevdan") - an important holiday, especially for teen Janjevci who would prepare a special celebration called "rifana".

Demographic history

In 1948, there were 5,290 Croats (0.7%) in Kosovo; in 1971 there were 8,264; in 1981 - 8,718 (0.6%); in 1991 - 8,062 (0.4%). During and after the Kosovo War, most of the community had fled to Croatia. 1998 estimations had their number at only 1,800, of which 350 lived in Janjevo. In 2008, there were only 300 Croats estimated to live in Janjevo. In 2011, about 270 Croats lived in the area.
The Croatian government has planned to resettle the remaining Janjevci in Kosovo to Croatia. According to the Kosovan 2011 census, there was a total of ca. 400 Janjevci, of whom 80 remain in the Vitina municipality.

Janjevci community in Croatia
Janjevci families started migrating to SR Croatia, part of Yugoslavia, in the 1950s, mostly settling in Zagreb. By the beginning of the 1970s, there was a large community of Janjevci along and within the vicinity of Konjšćinska Street in Dubrava, a district in the eastern part of Zagreb. They have since turned this area into a vibrant shopping district.

During the Yugoslav Wars, a significant part of the Janjevci emigrated to Croatia in several waves (1992, 1995, 1997, 1999), and Letničani were settled by the authorities in Voćin and Đulovac (western Slavonia) and Janjevci in Kistanje (the Dalmatian hinterland) in the abandoned homes of Serbs. Following the end of the Kosovo War from June to October 1999, the Janjevci population of Kosovo dropped from 700 to 360. Ongoing acts of violence and harassment from Kosovo Albanians and general uncertainty instigated the mass exodus.

In April 2017, 196 displaced Letničani, composed of 41 families who were waiting on homes promised by the state, were finally given newly built houses in the settlement Dumače, in the municipality of Petrinja.

According to records in 2002, there are 966 families of Janjevci in Croatia, with the majority of them residing in the capital Zagreb (669 families), and the rest in other parts of Croatia (297 families).

Famous people
Roko Glasnović - Croatian Roman Catholic prelate 
Anton Glasnović, Croatian sports shooter and World Championships silver medalist
Josip Glasnović, Croatian sports shooter and Olympic champion
Petar Palić, Croatian Roman Catholic prelate
Željko Glasnović, Croatian military officer and politician
Marijan Brkić Brk - Croatian guitarist and producer
Mario Petreković - croatian television actor and presenter

See also
 Gorani, Slavic Muslim community in Kosovo
 Croats in Serbia

Notes

References

External links
 
 Ovo je najstarija hrvatska dijaspora koja postoji od 14. stoljeća 

Croatian diaspora
Ethnic groups in Kosovo
Slavic ethnic groups
South Slavs
Catholic Church in Kosovo